The 1947 All-Big Nine Conference football team consists of American football players selected to the All-Big Nine Conference teams selected by the Associated Press (AP), United Press (UP) and the International News Service (INS) for the 1947 Big Nine Conference football season. The top vote getters in the AP voting by conference coaches were Leo Nomellini, Bob Chappuis, and Bump Elliott, each receiving 16 of 18 possible points.

All Big-Ten selections

Ends
 Bob Mann, Michigan (AP-1, INS-1, UP-1)
 Ike Owens, Illinois (AP-1, INS-1, UP-1)
Len Ford, Michigan (AP-2, INS-2, UP-2)
Lou Mihajlovich, Indiana (AP-2, INS-2)

Tackles
 Phil O'Reilly, Purdue (AP-1, INS-1, UP-1)
Lou Agase, Illinois (AP-1, INS-1)
Bill Pritula, Michigan (AP-2, INS-2, UP-1)
Dean Widseth, Minnesota (AP-2, INS-2)

Guards
 Howard Brown, Indiana (AP-1, INS-1, UP-1)
 Leo Nomellini, Minnesota (AP-1, INS-1, UP-1)
Dominic Tomasi, Michigan (AP-2, INS-2)
John Wrenn, Illinois (AP-2, INS-2)

Centers
 Red Wilson, Wisconsin (AP-1, INS-1, UP-1)
Lou Levanti, Illinois (AP-2, INS-2)

Quarterbacks
Howard Yerges, Michigan (AP-1, INS-2, UP-1)
Perry Moss, Illinois (AP-2, INS-2)

Halfbacks
 Bob Chappuis, Michigan (AP-1, INS-1, UP-1)
 Bump Elliott, Michigan (AP-1, INS-1, UP-1)
 Harry Szulborski, Purdue (AP-2, INS-1)
 George Taliaferro, Indiana (AP-2, INS-2)

Fullbacks
 Russ Steger, Illinois (AP-1, INS-1 [halfback]; UP-1)
 Jack Weisenburger, Michigan (AP-2, INS-2, UP-2)

Key
AP = Associated Press, chosen by conference coaches

UP = United Press

INS = International News Service

Bold = Consensus first-team selection by the AP, UP and INS

See also
1947 College Football All-America Team

References

1947 Big Nine Conference football season
All-Big Ten Conference football teams